Pobjenik is a village in the municipality of Čazma, Bjelovar-Bilogora County in Croatia. In the 2011 census, there are 215 inhabitants. In the 2001 census, there were 259 inhabitants in 100 family households.

Pobjenik is located on the north-western slopes of Moslavačka gora.

References 

Populated places in Bjelovar-Bilogora County